Wuyi may refer to:

Places
Wuyi Mountains (武夷山) in Fujian and Jiangxi
Wuyi County, Hebei (武邑县)
Wuyi County, Zhejiang (武义县)
Wuyi Lane, historical street in Nanjing
Wuyi, Anhui (乌衣镇), town in Nanqiao District, Chuzhou
Wuyi, Hengshui (武邑镇), town in and seat of Wuyi County, Hebei
Wuyi Avenue Subdistrict (五一大街街道), Qiaodong District, Zhangjiakou, Hebei
Wuyi (五邑 "five counties") of Jiangmen, Guangdong

Other uses
ROCS Wu Yi (AOE-530), a fleet oiler and logistics ship of the Republic of China Navy (ROCN)
Wu Yi of Shang or Wuyi, King of the Shang dynasty (12th century BC)
International Workers' Day (May First), Wuyi in Chinese
Wuyi Square (disambiguation), to commemorate May First

See also
Wu Yi (disambiguation)